Berkeley Square is a play in three acts by John L. Balderston (in collaboration with J.C. Squire) which tells the story of a young American who is transported back to London in the time of the American Revolution and meets his ancestors. The plot is loosely based on Henry James' posthumous 1917 novel The Sense of the Past.

The play premiered at the St Martin's Theatre in London's West End in 1926, where it ran for 179 performances. Its production on Broadway in 1929 was an enormous success with Leslie Howard (who also co-produced and co-directed the play with Gilbert Miller) in the role of time traveler Peter Standish and ran for 229 performances, a substantial run for its time.

The play was later adapted into a 1933 film version with Howard repeating his stage role of Peter Standish, winning him an Academy Award nomination. The play was also produced for a 1959 BBC television production and the 1951 film The House in the Square (released in the United States as I'll Never Forget You).

Original London cast
Tom Pettigrew - Brian Gilmour
Mr. Throstle - Ivor Barnard  
The Ambassador - J. Fisher White
Peter Standish - Lawrence Anderson  
Maid - Jane Millican/Edith Martyn
Lady Anne Pettigrew - Beatrice Wilson/Georgina Wynter  
Miss Pettigrew - Valerie Taylor 
Helen Pettigrew - Jean Forbes-Robertson 
Mrs. Barwick - Frances Ruttledge 
Marjorie Frant - Grizelda Hervey/Juliet Mansell/Jane Millican

Original Broadway cast
Mrs. Barwick - Lucy Beaumont
Miss Barrymore - June English
Marjorie Frant - Ann Freshman
Helen Pettigrew - Margalo Gillmore
Tom Pettigrew - Brian Gilmour
H. R. H. The Duke of Cumberland - Robert Greig
Maid - Irene Howard
Peter Standish - Leslie Howard
The Lady Anne Pettigrew - Alice John
Mr. Throstle - Tarver Penna
The Duchess of Devonshire - Louise Prussing
Major Clinton - Charles Romano
Kate Pettigrew - Valerie Taylor
Lord Stanley - Henry Warwick
The Ambassador - Fritz Williams

References

External links 

Literature about time travel
American plays adapted into films
1929 plays
Broadway plays
West End plays
Plays set in London
Plays set in the 18th century
Plays based on novels